Active is an unincorporated community in Bibb County, Alabama, United States.

History
The community was located on the Mobile and Ohio Railroad and was likely named to reflect the active spirit of its residents. A post office called Active was established in 1899, and remained in operation until it was discontinued in 1906.

Demographics
According to the census returns from 1850-2010 for Alabama, it has never reported a population figure separately on the U.S. Census.

References

Unincorporated communities in Bibb County, Alabama
Unincorporated communities in Alabama